Lipovo is a village (selo) in Shchyokinsky District of Tula Oblast, Russia.

References

Rural localities in Tula Oblast